"You Love the Thunder" is a song written and performed by American singer-songwriter Jackson Browne from his 1977 live album, Running on Empty, recorded at a concert at Garden State Arts Center in Holmdel, New Jersey, on September 6, 1977.  Released as the third single a full year after the album came out, it only reached #109 on Billboards Bubbling Under Hot 100 Singles chart, though it received increased Album-Oriented Rock airplay. The B-side of the U.S. single was "The Road"; however, the B-side for the British single was "Cocaine".

History
The lyrics seem to describe the relationship of a musician and a spouse or girlfriend who comes along on tour, keeping with the theme of the Running on Empty album, but they can be read more universally, as well:

You love the thunder, and you love the rain —
What you see revealed within the anger is worth the pain.
And before the lightning fades and you surrender,
You've got a second to look at the dark side of the man.

You love the thunder and you love the rain —
You know your hunger like you know your name.
And I know you wonder how you ever came
To be a woman in love with a man in search of the flame...

In his 1978 review of the album, Paul Nelson wrote:  "Browne forges a temporary relationship with a kindred spirit, only to realize 'You can dream/But you can never go back the way you came.'"  Billboard Magazine commented on the "engagingly unpolished vocals" and "dynamic instrumental track."

Reception
Cash Box said that it has a "moderate pace, good lyrics and a strong hook," as well as "effective" slide guitar and backing vocals.

Personnel
Jackson Browne – vocals, acoustic guitar
Rosemary Butler, Doug Haywood – background vocals
Craig Doerge – piano
Danny Kortchmar – electric guitar
Russ Kunkel – drums
David Lindley – slide guitar
Leland Sklar – bass guitar

Chart positions

Notes

1977 songs
1978 singles
Jackson Browne songs
Songs written by Jackson Browne
Asylum Records singles
Song recordings produced by Jackson Browne